Homeobox protein SIX4 is a protein that in humans is encoded by the SIX4 gene.

References

Further reading

Transcription factors